Namagiri Marendrapatnam is a village in Rowthulapudi Mandal, Kakinada district in the state of Andhra Pradesh in India.

Geography 

Demographics 
 India census, Namagiri Narendrapatnam Village had a population of 3,107, out of which 1542 were male and 1565 were female. Population of children below 6 years of age were 315. The literacy rate of the village is 47.82%.

References 

Villages in Rowthulapudi mandal